Vincent Joseph Powell (6 August 1928 – 13 July 2009) was a British television scriptwriter. He  collaborated with a writing partner, Harry Driver, until 1973.

Early life 
Powell was born as Vincent Joseph Smith to Roman Catholic parents in Miles Platting, Manchester. When he was five, his mother died; two years later, his father remarried. Powell began a career as a tailor following the lead of his father, while performing as a comedian in the evenings. He met Harry Driver on the local club circuit. Their performing partnership under the name Hammond and Powell lasted until 1955 when Driver's health and physical mobility became severely impaired by the onset of polio.

Career 
With his writing partner, Harry Driver, the partnership was hired to write material for comedian Harry Worth in Manchester for the BBC in 1960. The show, Here's Harry (co-written with Frank Roscoe) ran for five years. The partnership was better known for writing for ITV franchise holders from the early-1960s, beginning with Coronation Street from 1961; Powell ceased writing for the programme in 1964, but Driver's involvement continued until he died in 1973. Powell and Driver created and wrote 11 sitcoms for ITV in an eight-year period, including the shows Bless This House (with Sid James) and Love Thy Neighbour, though other writers contributed scripts to both series. The latter programme, according to The Times, was "one of television's most notorious, if at the time highly popular, comedies". While it was "intended to debunk racial stereotypes" it "came to be widely condemned for doing exactly the opposite."

Other popular series created and written by them for ITV include:

Script projects 
 Pardon the Expression (1965–66), starring Arthur Lowe reprising the role of Leonard Swindley, a character which first appeared in Coronation Street. 
 George and the Dragon (1966–68), starring Sid James and Peggy Mount as chauffeur and housekeeper to Colonel Maynard (John Le Mesurier)
 Never Mind the Quality, Feel the Width (1967–1971), set in the London rag trade, featuring an ethnically mis-matched pair of tailors, the Jewish Manny Cohen (John Bluthal) and the Irish-Catholic Patrick Kelly (Joe Lynch)
 Nearest and Dearest (1968–1973), set in a Pickle Factory in Colne, North-West of England, starring (Hylda Baker) and (Jimmy Jewel) as squabbling siblings Nellie and Eli Pledge, running the Pickle Factory business left by their late father. Powell and Driver left after the first series, though the show (written by writers such as Roy Bottomley and Tom Brennand) continued in their absence.
 Two in Clover (1969–70), starring Sid James and Victor Spinetti, as Clerks-turned-Farmers 
 For the Love of Ada (1970–71), in which Irene Handl and Wilfred Pickles played romantically involved pensioners
 Bless This House (1971–76), starring Sid James and Diana Coupland, as Sid and Jean Abbott, along with Robin Stewart and Sally Geeson as their teenage son and daughter, living in Birch Avenue, Putney. 
 Love Thy Neighbour (1972–1976), centred around a white couple and a black couple living as next-door neighbours in Twickenham, London, during an era, in which Britain was coming to terms with the population of Black Immigrants. The series featured Jack Smethurst and Kate Williams as Eddie and Joan Booth, with Rudolph Walker and Nina Baden-Semper as Bill and Barbie Reynolds.  Powell co-wrote a 1979 sequel Love Thy Neighbour in Australia.
 Spring And Autumn  (1973–1976), starring Jimmy Jewel as a retired widower, parting ways from Up North to live with his daughter and her husband in a high-rise block, Down South, let alone making friends with a pre-teen cockney lad.

After Driver died, Powell worked solo and created later shows such as:

 The Wackers (1975), set in mid-1970s Liverpool, starring Ken Jones and Sheila Fay, along with Joe Gladwin. Notable for early TV roles for Alison Steadman and Keith Chegwin as the lead couple's teenage children. The show caused such a backlash that the series was scrapped before the last episode was broadcast and never repeated again.
 Mind Your Language (1977–1979, 1986), starring Barry Evans (previously in the Doctor... series) as the English-Foreign Language teacher Mr Jeremy Brown, set in an adult education college of foreign characters in late-1970s London.
 Young at Heart (1977–1982), 
 Bottle Boys (1984–85), starring Robin Askwith as Dave Deacon, a football-obsessed milkman.

Powell also penned a number of scripts for the popular 1980s sitcom Never the Twain (1981–1991) starring Windsor Davies and Donald Sinden, also for Thames Television, writing all of the final episodes from 1989 to 1991. Plus he wrote three series (20 episodes) of the Radio 2 sitcom For Better Or For Worse, starring Gorden Kaye and Su Pollard, between 1993 and 1996.

Powell contributed material to the Cilla Black vehicles Blind Date (224 episodes) and Surprise, Surprise (130 episodes). He published his autobiography, From Rags to Gags, in 2008.

Death 
Powell died aged 80 in Guildford, Surrey. His first marriage ended in divorce; as did his second marriage, to Judi Smith. His third marriage, to Geraldine Moore, ended when he died. He had a son from his second marriage, and a son and daughter from his third.

Writing credits

References

External links

1928 births
2009 deaths
Male actors from Manchester
English Roman Catholics
English television producers
English television writers
People from Guildford
People from Miles Platting
British male television writers
20th-century English screenwriters